The Toledo Rockets women's basketball team represents the University of Toledo in women's basketball. The school competes in the Mid-American Conference in Division I of the National Collegiate Athletic Association (NCAA). The Rockets play home basketball games at Savage Arena at the campus in Toledo, Ohio.

Season-by-season record
As of the 2016–17 season, the Rockets have a 808–534 record, with a 425–245 record in the Mid-American Conference. Toledo has won the Mid-American Conference women's basketball tournament nine times (1991, 1992, 1995, 1996, 1997, 1999, 2001, 2017, 2023) while finishing as runner-up in 1984, 1989, 1994, 1998, 2000, and 2010. They reached the Second round of the NCAA tournament in 1992 and 1996. They have made 10 appearances in the Women's National Invitation Tournament, winning the title in 2011 and quarterfinals appearances in 2012 and 2022.

NCAA tournament

WNIT

References

External links